Lili Kraus (3 April 19036 November 1986) was a Hungarian-born pianist.

Biography
Lili Kraus was born in Budapest in 1903. Her father was from Czech Lands, and her mother from an assimilated Jewish Hungarian family.

She enrolled at the Franz Liszt Academy of Music, and at the age of 17 entered the Budapest Conservatory where she studied with Zoltán Kodály, and Béla Bartók. In the 1930s, she continued her studies with Severin Eisenberger, Eduard Steuermann in Vienna and Artur Schnabel in Berlin, who focused her interest in the classical tradition.

Lili Kraus soon became known as a specialist in Mozart and Beethoven. Her early chamber music performances and recording with violinist Szymon Goldberg helped gain the critical acclaim that launched her international career. In the 1930s, she toured Europe, Japan, Australia and South Africa. In 1940, Kraus embarked on a tour of Asia where, while in Java, she and her family were captured and interned in a concentration camp by the Japanese from June 1943 until August 1945.

After the war, she settled in New Zealand, where she spent many happy years playing, performing, and teaching.  She became a New Zealand citizen and resumed her career, teaching and touring extensively. In the early 1950s she performed the entire Beethoven sonata cycle with violinist Henri Temianka. From 1967 to 1983, she taught as artist-in-residence at Texas Christian University in Fort Worth.

In 1982 she served on the jury of the Paloma O'Shea Santander International Piano Competition. After that she made her home in Asheville, North Carolina, where she died in 1986.

Kraus's husband was Otto Mandl (1889-1956), a wealthy Jewish (later converted to Catholicism) mining engineer and philosopher.
They were married on 31 October 1930 and Mandl sold his business in order to devote himself to the furtherance of Kraus's career. The couple had two children, Ruth and Michael.

External links
 Biography at Bach Cantatas
 European Archive Copyright free LP recording of Lili Kraus playing two Haydn piano sonatas at the European Archive (for non-American viewers only).
 Naxos: Lili Kraus
 'Camera Three' episode: Lili Kraus on Schubert 'Grazer' Fantasy (11/2/1969) (audio only)

References 

1903 births
1986 deaths
20th-century Hungarian people
20th-century classical pianists
Hungarian classical pianists
Hungarian women pianists
New Zealand classical pianists
New Zealand women pianists
Jewish classical pianists
Franz Liszt Academy of Music alumni
Texas classical music
Hungarian refugees
Hungarian expatriates in Italy
Hungarian expatriates in Indonesia
Hungarian emigrants to New Zealand
Hungarian people of Czech descent
Hungarian Roman Catholics
Hungarian people of Jewish descent
Musicians from Budapest
Women classical pianists
20th-century British musicians
Pupils of Béla Bartók
Pupils of Artur Schnabel
20th-century composers
Music & Arts artists
20th-century women composers
20th-century women pianists